Kyoto Institute of Technology (京都工芸繊維大学, Kyōto Kōgei Sen'i Daigaku) in Kyoto, Japan is a Japanese national university established in 1949. The Institute's history extends back to two schools, Kyoto Craft High School (established in 1902 at Sakyo-ku, Yoshida) and Kyoto Sericulture Training School (established in 1899 at Kita-ku, Daishogun, under the jurisdiction of the Ministry of Agriculture and Commerce), which were forerunners of the Faculty of Engineering and Design and the Faculty of Textile Science, respectively. The former was moved to Sakyo-ku, Matsugasaki in 1930 and changed its name to Kyoto Industrial High School in 1944. The latter developed into Kyoto Sericulture High School, under supervision of the Ministry of Education in 1914, and changed its name to Kyoto Sericulture Technical High School in 1931 and then to Kyoto Technical High School of Sericulture in 1944. The two forerunners merged in 1949, due to educational system revisions, to establish the present School of Science and Technology. Together with Shinshu University and Tokyo University of Agriculture and Technology, the Institute is one of Japan's three historical centers of textile research.

Kyoto Institute of Technology has a campus at Matsugasaki in Sakyō-ku. Another campus is at Saga in Ukyō-ku. Its Japanese nickname is Kōsen (工繊). In English it is known as KIT.

Beginning in October 2007, graduate course instruction became available in English through the International Program for Science and Technology for specially selected students from the 50 institutions worldwide with KIT Exchange Agreements.

Statistics 
2,968 undergraduates (23% women) and 1110 graduate students (23% women), 170 of whom are international students from 30 countries, comprised the student body as of May 1, 2011. From 2008 to 2009, 330 KIT researchers traveled abroad and 175 researchers came to KIT from abroad.

Programs

Undergraduate programs
Applied Biology
Biomolecular Engineering
Macromolecular Science and Engineering
Chemistry and Materials Technology
Electronics
Information Science
Mechanical and System Engineering
Design Engineering and Management
Architecture and Design
Integrated Science and Technology (evening programs in Bioscience, Nanomaterial Science, Mechatronics Technology and Information Design Technology)

The university graduate school, established in 1988, awards master's and doctoral degrees in science and technology.

Master's programs
Applied Biology
Biomolecular Engineering
Macromolecular Science and Engineering
Chemistry and Materials Technology
Electronics
Information Science
Mechanical and Systems Engineering
Design Engineering and Management
Architecture and Design
Design
Architectural Engineering
Advanced Fibro-Science

Doctoral programs
Materials and Life Science
Engineering Design
Design Science
Advanced Fibro-Science
Biobased Materials Science

Centers and campus facilities

Cooperative Research Center
Drosophila Genetic Resource Center
Center for Instrumental Analysis
Center for Environmental Science
Center for Information Science
Radioisotope Laboratory
Venture Laboratory
Incubation Center
Center for Fiber and Textile Science
Center for Bioresource Field Science
Center for Manufacturing Technology
International Exchange Center
Health Care Service Center
Center Hall
University Library
Museum and Archives
Sustainable Design Education Research Center

In 2006, 28 patents were attributed to Kyoto Institute of Technology.

Notable KIT graduates and professors

Asai Chu (1856–1907) Artist
Motono, Seigo 1882–1944 (architect, professor) 
Sei-ichi Shiraiphotos of work (1905–1983) Architect, KIT graduate
Kimura, Kosuke  (professor emeritus, former president)
Nakamura, Masao  (professor emeritus, architect and researcher of tea houses and sukiya-style construction)
Takeda, Goichi  1872–1938
Yoshitake, Touri  1886–1945 (alumni and architect, designer of the Diet Yokohama Customs Buildings)
Matsukuma, Hiroshi  (History and Philosophy of Architecture, Public Space Planner)
Jinnai, Hiroshi (professor),
Kishi, Waro  (born 1950) (professor emeritus, architect)
Kimura, Hiroaki  (born 1952)(professor, architect)
Kojima, Kazuhiro  (1958 – professor, architect)
Yoneda, Akira  (born 1959)(professor, architect)
Kidosaki, Nagisa  (born 1960)(professor, architect)
Nagasaka, Dai (born 1960)(professor, architect)
Sakamoto, Chikao (1911–1998) alumni and former director of Hokkaido and Okinawa Development Bureaux
Ono, Shinji （1947–1967）former governor of Wakayama Prefecture
Matsui, Takaji (1956) – alumni, Biologist at Kyoto Municipal Zoo, Japan Center for Amphibians and Reptiles
Sato, Sanpei - (born 1929) Cartoonist and Political Satirist of Fujisan Taro (Asahi Shinbun, 1965) fame
Mishima, Hisanori (alumni, architect and urban planner)
Kita, Chikara (alumni and architect)
Itoh, Sekisui  (born 1914)(alumni, ceramic artist and living national treasure)
Kurosaki, Akira (born 1937) (alumni, woodblock artist)
Yama, Rokuro (1897–1982)

References

External links
  (in English)
 Centers and Campus Facilities

Universities and colleges in Kyoto
Japanese national universities
Engineering universities and colleges in Japan
Kansai Collegiate American Football League